Aditi Mutatkar (born 6 October 1987) is an Indian badminton player from Pune, Maharashtra. She won the Silver Medal in Mixed team event in 2010 Commonwealth Games held in Delhi, 2010. She reached her highest rank of 27th in the world when she registered her career-best performance of reaching the finals of the Bitburger Open. In the domestic circuit, she has won the Badminton Nationals in all age categories, only the third woman in this country to do so.

Aditi's career has been riddled with injuries. After a one and a half year hiatus due to injury, in 2012-13, she has made a strong comeback with a third-place finish in the senior nationals and victory at the State Championships.

Career titles and runners-up

BWF Grand Prix 
The BWF Grand Prix has two level such as Grand Prix and Grand Prix Gold. It is a series of badminton tournaments, sanctioned by Badminton World Federation (BWF) since 2007.

Women's singles

 BWF Grand Prix Gold tournament
 BWF Grand Prix tournament

Career overview
Career Summary    
 Winner of 5 National Badminton Championships (under 13, under 16, under 19 and Senior Nationals) (Only the third woman in India to have achieved this)   
 Represented the Indian Badminton team in multiple International tournaments   
 Winner of silver and bronze medals on multiple occasions in International Championships   
 Highest ranking achieved was 27th  during 2008 – 2009   
 Second Indian woman to have played a Grand Prix final in 2008 (after Saina Nehwal)

Domestic Achievements
 Mini National Champion (under 13) at Mandya in 2000   
 Gold medalist in Schools National Game at Bharuch in 2000   
 Sub Junior National Champion (under 16) at Patna in 2002   
 Junior National Champion (under 19) at Panchkula in 2006   
 Senior National Ranking Tournament winner in Mumbai (2006), Indore (2006) and Bangalore (2007)   
 Silver medalist in National Games at Guwahati in 2008   
 Senior National Champion at Rohtak in 2011  
 Semi Finalist at Senior Nationals held in Pune in 2013
 State Champion at Mumbai in 2013
 Winner of the team event at Inter PSPB badminton tournament in 2013

International Achievements    
 Semi-finalist in French Junior Open Championship in 2001   
 Semi-finalist in Yonex Sunrise Singapore Junior Championship in 2001   
 Bronze medalist in Junior Asian Badminton Championship in Malaysia in 2002   
 Runner up in Bitburger Open Grand Prix event in Germany in October 2008
 Semi-finalist in  Bulgarian Open Grand Prix event in October 2008   
 Semi-finalist in Dutch Open Grand Prix event  in October 2008   
 Runner-up in Indian International Grand Prix in Lucknow in 2009   
 Quarter Finalist in Asian Badminton Championship in New Delhi in April 2010   
 Silver Medalist in Mixed Team Event representing Indian Badminton Team for Commonwealth Games in New Delhi in Oct 2010

References

External links
 
 Aditi Mutatkar's blog

Indian female badminton players
Indian national badminton champions
Commonwealth Games silver medallists for India
Sportswomen from Madhya Pradesh
Living people
1987 births
Marathi sportspeople
People from Gwalior
Badminton players at the 2010 Asian Games
Badminton players at the 2010 Commonwealth Games
Commonwealth Games medallists in badminton
21st-century Indian women
21st-century Indian people
Racket sportspeople from Madhya Pradesh
Asian Games competitors for India
Medallists at the 2010 Commonwealth Games